Katherine Mary Taylor (born 1962) is a French-born Canadian critic and novelist, a cultural journalist at The Globe and Mail newspaper. She is author of three novels, Mme Proust and the Kosher Kitchen, A Man in Uniform and Serial Monogamy.

Biography 
Katherine Mary Taylor as born in 1962 in Boulogne-Billancourt, France.
The child of a Canadian diplomat, Taylor was born in France, and grew up both in Europe and in Ottawa. She attended Glebe Collegiate Institute in Ottawa, and studied history and art history at the University of Toronto. She has an M.A. in journalism from the University of Western Ontario in London, Ontario. 
After working at the London Free Press and the Hamilton Spectator, Taylor joined the copy desk of The Globe and Mail in 1989. She moved into the arts section in 1991 and was appointed theatre critic in 1995. She served in that role until 2003, winning two Nathan Cohen Awards for her reviews.
In 2009, she was awarded the Atkinson Fellowship in Public Policy Journalism to study Canadian cultural sovereignty in the digital age. The results were published in the Toronto Star in September 2010.

Fiction

Taylor's first novel, Mme Proust and the Kosher Kitchen, combines the stories of three women. One is Jeanne Proust, mother of the French novelist Marcel Proust; the second is the fictional Sarah Simon, a French-Jewish refugee living in wartime Toronto and the third is a contemporary narrator, a Montreal translator named Marie Prevost. The novel, published in 2003 by Doubleday Canada and Chatto & Windus in the U.K., won the Commonwealth Prize for best first book (Canada/Caribbean region), the Toronto Book Award and the Canadian Jewish Book Award for fiction.

Taylor's second novel, A Man in Uniform, is a fictional detective story set in Paris at the end of the 19th century and based on the actual Dreyfus Affair. It was published in August, 2010 by Doubleday Canada  and by Crown Publishing in the United States in January, 2011.

Her third novel, Serial Monogamy, was published by Doubleday Canada in 2016.

References

External links
http://www.katetaylor.ca

1962 births
Living people
21st-century Canadian novelists
University of Toronto alumni
Canadian women journalists
University of Western Ontario alumni
The Globe and Mail columnists
Canadian women novelists
Canadian women columnists
21st-century Canadian women writers
Canadian theatre critics
Canadian women non-fiction writers
21st-century Canadian non-fiction writers
Canadian art critics